Zenkeria sebastinei is a  species of grass in the family Poaceae found in Pothigai Hills, Kerala, India.

References

Molinieae
Bunchgrasses of Asia
Grasses of India